Ian Bertram is an American comic book artist and a New York's School of Visual Arts graduate. He is working and living in New York. He creates mystical, grotesque, and primal portraits of the strange. He has published with Marvel, DC, Image, and Dark Horse Comics. He has shown work in New York, Sri Lanka, and Paris.

Bibliography
Interior comic work includes: 
1001 (script and art, 17 pages, MoCCA, 2011)
Bowery Boys: Our Fathers (with Cory Levine and Brent McKee, webcomic, 2013–2016)
Detective Comics vol. 2 #27: "Better Days" (with Peter Tomasi, co-feature, DC Comics, 2014)
Batman Eternal #11: "Day of the Dads" (with Scott Snyder, James Tynion IV, Ray Fawkes and Tim Seeley, DC Comics, 2014)
Secret Origins vol. 3 #4: "A Boy's Life: The Secret Origin of Damian Wayne" (with Peter Tomasi, anthology, DC Comics, 2014)
Wolverine and the X-Men vol. 2 #10: "Wolverine is Dead; Eulogy" (with Jason Latour, among other artists, Marvel, 2014)
Zero #15: "Where Flesh Circulates" (with Ales Kot, Image, 2015)
Think of a City page 50 (script and art, Internet art project, 2015)
House of Penance #1-6 (with Peter Tomasi, Dark Horse, 2016)
Little Bird #1-5 (with Darcy Van Poelgeest, Image, 2019)
Precious Metal #1-5 (with Darcy Van Poelgeest, Image, Upcoming)

Covers only
Regular Show #9 (KaBOOM!, 2013)
Bravest Warriors #16 (KaBOOM!, 2014)
Guardians 3000 #2 (Marvel, 2015)
Sinestro #10 (DC Comics, 2015)
Secret Wars: E is for Extinction #1-4 (Marvel, 2015)
The New World #1 (Image, 2018)
Black Hammer/Justice League #2 (Dark Horse, 2019)
Something is Killing the Children #2 (Boom! Studios, 2019)

References

External links

Year of birth missing (living people)
Living people
American comics artists